Redefine may refer to:
 Redefine (Soil album), 2004
 Redefine (Dragon Fli Empire album), 2009
 Redefine (magazine), an independent music and art magazine from the United States
 "Redefine", a 2002 rap song by Mars Ill
 "Redefine", a song by the American band Bright from their self-titled album

See also
 Redefin
 "Redefinition", an episode of the television show Angel